Pelusios broadleyi, commonly known as the Turkana mud turtle, Broadley's mud turtle, or the Lake Turkana hinged terrapin, is a species of turtle in the family Pelomedusidae. The species is native to eastern Africa.

Geographic range
Pelusios broadleyi is endemic to Lake Turkana in East Africa. It has only been confirmed from the Kenyan part of this lake, but may well occur in the Ethiopian (it has been recorded very close to the border).

Habitat
The preferred natural habitat of P. broadleyi is freshwater wetlands.

Etymology
The specific name, broadleyi, is in honor of herpetologist Donald G. Broadley.

References

Further reading
Bour R (1986). "Note sur Pelusios adansonii (Schweigger, 1812) et sur une nouvelle espèce affine du Kenya (Chelonii, Pelomedusidae)". Studia Geologica Salmanticensia, Studia Palaeocheloniologica 2 (2): 23–54. (Pelusios broadleyi, new species). (in French).
Spawls S, Howell K, Hinkel H, Menegon M (2018). Field Guide to East African Reptiles, Second Edition. London: Bloomsbury Natural History. 624 pp. . (Pelusios broadleyi, p. 54).

Turkana mud turtle
Reptiles of Kenya
Endemic fauna of Kenya
Turkana mud turtle
Taxonomy articles created by Polbot